Aerides multiflora, the multi-flowered aerides, is a species of orchid, native to Southeast Asia, the Coromandel Coast, and Bangladesh.

Synonymy and confusion 
In 1820, William Roxburgh published a description of Aerides multiflora.  In 1882, João Barbosa Rodrigues published a description of a very different plant under the name of Epidendrum geniculatum. Eight years later, in 1890, Joseph Dalton Hooker published a description of an orchid now recognized as Aerides multiflora Roxb. and named it Epidendrum geniculatum.  Thus, Epidendrum geniculatum Barb.Rodr. is a very different taxon from Epidendrum geniculatum Hook.f., a synonym for Aerides multiflora Roxb., the subject of this article.

Sinonimia y confusión
En 1820, William Roxburgh publicó una descripción de la Aerides multiflora.  En 1882, João Barbosa Rodrigues publicó una descripción de una planta muy diferente con el nombre de Epidendrum geniculatum. . Ocho años más tarde, en 1890, Joseph Dalton Hooker publicó la descripción de una orquídea hoy conocida como Aerides multiflora Roxb. y la llamó Epidendrum geniculatum. Por lo tanto, Epidendrum geniculatumBarb.Rodr. es un taxón muy diferente de Epidendrum geniculatum Hook.f., que es sinónimo de Aerides multiflora Roxb..

Content in this edit is translated from the existing English Wikipedia article at :es:Aerides multiflorum; see its history for attribution.

References

multiflora
Orchids of Bangladesh
Orchids of Thailand
Orchids of Vietnam